Guarino "Willie" Moretti (February 24, 1894 – October 4, 1951), also known as Willie Moore, was a notorious underboss of the Genovese crime family and a cousin of the family boss Frank Costello.

Criminal career 
Born Guarino Moretti in Bari, Apulia, southern Italy, Moretti immigrated to the United States with his family to live in New Jersey.

On January 12, 1913, after being convicted of robbery in New York City, Moretti was sentenced to one year in state prison in Elmira, New York. He was released after several months.

From 1933 to 1951, Moretti, in association with Joe Adonis, Settimo Accardi and Abner Zwillman, ran lucrative gambling dens in New Jersey and upstate New York. His operations were based out of his homes in Hasbrouck Heights (located in Bergen County, New Jersey, just outside New York City) and Deal (located in Monmouth County, New Jersey along the Jersey Shore).

Hollywood connections 
Moretti was the godfather of then-unknown singer Frank Sinatra. Sinatra's first wife, Nancy Barbato, was a paternal cousin of John Barbato, a Moretti associate. Moretti helped Sinatra get bookings in New Jersey clubs in return for kickbacks. Finally, in 1939, Sinatra signed a recording contract with band leader Tommy Dorsey. However, by the early 1940s, Sinatra had achieved national popularity and wanted to sign a more lucrative recording contract, but Dorsey refused to release him from their existing contract. A rumour claimed that Sinatra asked Moretti for help, and it was alleged that Moretti jammed a gun barrel down Dorsey's throat and threatened to kill him if he did not release Sinatra. Dorsey eventually sold the contract to Sinatra for one dollar.

In the late 1940s, Moretti became acquainted with comedians Dean Martin and Jerry Lewis while they were performing at Bill Miller's Riviera nightclub in Fort Lee, New Jersey. In earlier years, Moretti and Abner "Longy" Zwillman were watching the club's cardroom when it was previously owned by Ben Marden. In 1947, Martin, Lewis, Sinatra, and comedian Milton Berle all performed at the wedding reception of Moretti's daughter.

Testimony before the Kefauver Committee 

In 1950, the U.S. Senate Select Committee on Organized Crime started an investigation known as the Kefauver hearings, named after its chairman, Sen. Estes Kefauver.  Along with other members of Genovese family, Moretti, by then widely known by his alias "Willie Moore," was called to testify. Moretti was the only one who cooperated with the committee. While the other mobsters refused to testify by repeatedly invoking the Fifth Amendment to the United States Constitution, which provides legal protection against self-incrimination, the garrulous Moretti told jokes, spoke candidly, and generally played it up for the cameras. For example, when asked how long he'd been in the Mafia he replied, "What do you mean, like do I carry a membership card that says 'Mafia' on it?" And when asked how he operated politically he said, "I don't operate politically, if I did I'd be a congressman." The Senators and spectators in the room often broke out laughing at his snarky and sarcastic responses.

Death 
As it was being alleged that Moretti's mental condition was possibly deteriorating from advanced-stage syphilis, it was feared that he was becoming too talkative.  An open contract was placed by the mob commission to have him killed. Twelve years later, government witness Joe Valachi described a conversation with Genovese crime family boss Vito Genovese about the Moretti murder:

It was supposedly a mercy killing because he was sick. Genovese told me, 'The Lord have mercy on his soul, he's losing his mind.' 

On October 4, 1951, Moretti was lunching with four other men at Joe's Elbow Room Restaurant in Cliffside Park, New Jersey. The waitress remembered the men, the only patrons in the restaurant, joking together in Italian before she went into the kitchen. At 11:28 am, the restaurant staff heard shots fired and ran into the dining room. Moretti was lying dead on his back on the floor with bullet wounds to the face and head. By some accounts, the shots to his face were a sign of respect. The gunmen had already fled the restaurant. The waitress was able to tentatively identify the man who brought him to the restaurant as Anastasia Crime Family capo John "Johnny Roberts" Robilotto. The shooters are suspected to have been Antonio Caponigro and Joseph "Pepe" LiCalsi.

On the day of Moretti's murder, Martin and Lewis had a lunch date scheduled with Moretti. However, earlier that morning, Lewis learned that he had contracted the mumps and both men totally forgot about lunch. Later, while trying to reach Moretti to apologize and explain, they learned from the television news that he was dead.

Moretti's funeral service was conducted at Corpus Christi Roman Catholic Church in Hasbrouck Heights, New Jersey. Moretti was buried at St Michael's Cemetery in South Hackensack, New Jersey. Over 5,000 mourners attended the burial, resulting in a circus-like atmosphere that required police intervention.

In popular culture 
In A Man of Honor: The Autobiography of Joseph Bonanno, Simon & Schuster, Joseph Bonanno referred to Willie Moretti as Frank Costello's "strength." This would later be compared to the relationship between Mario Puzo's character "Luca Brasi" and "Don Vito Corleone's" so-called "strength" in the novel The Godfather.
In The Sopranos episode D-Girl, the character Christopher Moltisanti tells Jon Favreau the story of Moretti intimidating Tommy Dorsey, which Favreau cites as the inspiration for the Corleone family's efforts to release Johnny Fontane from a contract by Luca Brasi and Vito Corleone by "making the band leader who held Johnny's contract an offer he couldn't refuse", according to Michael Corleone, telling the story to his girlfriend Kay Adams in The Godfather.

References

Further reading 
Reid, Ed and Demaris, Ovid. The Green Felt Jungle. Montreal: Pocket Books, 1964. 241 pages.
Bonanno, Joseph. In A Man of Honor: The Autobiography of Joseph Bonanno, Simon & Schuster, 1984.

External links 
New York Stories – Part I by John William Tuohy
TIME Magazine Archive Article – Willing Willie – December 25, 1950
TIME Magazine Archive Article – Willie's Million – February 26, 1951

1894 births
1951 deaths
Deaths by firearm in New Jersey
Genovese crime family
Murdered American gangsters of Italian descent
People from Deal, New Jersey
People from Hasbrouck Heights, New Jersey
People murdered in New Jersey